The Portavant Mound (also known as the Portavant Mound Site or Snead Island Temple Mound or Portavant Indian Mound) is an archaeological site on Snead Island within the Emerson Point Preserve, just west of Palmetto, Florida. On December 23, 1994, it was added to the U.S. National Register of Historic Places.

The Portavant Mound (or Snead Island Temple Mound) is one of fifteen or more "temple mounds" produced by the Safety Harbor culture (900–1725) found in the vicinity of Tampa Bay. The mound is four meters high, measures 45 m by 75 m at the base, and has a flat top that is 24 m by 46 m. Unlike other "temple mounds" around the Tampa Bay area, the Portavant Mound does not have a ramp to the top of the mound. There is a lower (one m high) platform, about 30 m by 30 m, that abuts the main mound. The Portavant Mound was made from soil mixed with debris from middens. Several other mounds, also consisting of soil mixed with midden debris, are near the "temple mound".
 
The Portavant Mound site has been the target of a stabilization project to protect the mounds from damage from river erosion, looting, foot traffic, and exotic vegetation.

See also
 Emerson Point Preserve
 Snead Island

References

External links

 Manatee County listings at National Register of Historic Places
 Archaeological Stabilization Guide

Woodland period
Fort Walton culture
Archaeological sites on the National Register of Historic Places in Florida
National Register of Historic Places in Manatee County, Florida
Florida Native American Heritage Trail
Mounds in Florida
Protected areas of Manatee County, Florida